Yandi Sofyan Munawar (born 25 May 1992) is an Indonesian professional footballer who plays as a forward for Liga 1 club Persikabo 1973. Yandi is the younger brother of former Persib Bandung and Indonesia national team player Zaenal Arif.

Club career 
He used to be a part of the Brisbane Roar FC Youth team in the National Premier Leagues Queensland, on loan from Arema Cronus. During the loan period he played in 13 matches and scored two goals.

In December 2014, he was signed with Persib Bandung. Yandi Munawar made his professional debut on February 25, 2015, coming on as a substitute in Persib's 4–1 win over New Radiant S.C. in the 2015 AFC Cup and scoring one goal.

International career
In 2013, Yandi Munawar represented the Indonesia U-23, in the 2013 Southeast Asian Games.

Career statistics

Club

International

International goals 
International under-23 goals

Personal life
Yandi married Indonesia women's national volleyball team player Pungky Afriecia on 22 July 2018. She played in the 2018 Asian Games volleyball tournament, finishing seventh.

Honours

Club
Persib Bandung
 Indonesia President's Cup: 2015

International
Indonesia U-23
 Southeast Asian Games  Silver medal: 2013

References

External links 
 

Living people
1992 births
Indonesian footballers
People from Garut Regency
Sportspeople from West Java
Indonesian expatriate footballers
Expatriate footballers in Belgium
Expatriate footballers in Uruguay
Expatriate soccer players in Australia
Indonesian expatriate sportspeople in Belgium
Indonesian expatriate sportspeople in Uruguay
Indonesian expatriate sportspeople in Australia
Challenger Pro League players
Liga 1 (Indonesia) players
C.S. Visé players
Brisbane Roar FC players
Arema F.C. players
Persib Bandung players
Bali United F.C. players
Persikota Tangerang players
Persikabo 1973 players
Indonesia youth international footballers
Association football forwards
Footballers at the 2014 Asian Games
Southeast Asian Games silver medalists for Indonesia
Southeast Asian Games medalists in football
Competitors at the 2013 Southeast Asian Games
Asian Games competitors for Indonesia